La Luisiana is a city located in the province of Seville, Spain. According to the 2005 census (INE), the city has a population of 4495 inhabitants.

References

External links
La Luisiana - Sistema de Información Multiterritorial de Andalucía <-- Broken link July 2015

Municipalities of the Province of Seville
Settlement schemes in Spain